Rita Razmaitė (born 20 June 1967) is a Lithuanian former cyclist. She competed at the 1992 Summer Olympics and the 1996 Summer Olympics.

References

External links
 

1967 births
Living people
Lithuanian female cyclists
Olympic cyclists of Lithuania
Cyclists at the 1992 Summer Olympics
Cyclists at the 1996 Summer Olympics
Sportspeople from Kretinga